This is a list of current defence ministers of the 193 United Nations member states, Holy See (Vatican City) and the State of Palestine.

Defence ministers of sovereign countries with limited recognition are included in a separate table.

States recognised by the United Nations

Notes

States with limited recognition, non-UN member states

See also 
Lists of office-holders
Chief of Defense

References

Defence
Defence ministers